Gagata sexualis is a species of sisorid catfish endemic to India. This species grows to a length of  TL.

References

External links

Sisoridae
Fish of India
Endemic fauna of India
Fish described in 1970